Bad Books is the debut album from the folk/indie rock collaboration project by folk artist Kevin Devine and members of indie rock band Manchester Orchestra. It was released digitally on October 19, 2010, and with a physical CD copy following on November 9, 2010 through Manchester Orchestra's own label Favorite Gentlemen Recordings. Six songs on the album were written by Kevin Devine, with the other five written by Andy Hull.

The album was recorded at Manchester Orchestra's own studio by band member Robert McDowell. The album's artwork was designed by band member Chris Freeman and Brian Manley.

On August 25, 2010, "You Wouldn't Have to Ask" was offered as a free download on the band's official website. Later that day, "Please Move" was offered for free listening on the band's Facebook page. The band made the full album available for streaming on MySpace on October 15, 2010.

The band supported the release of the album with a short 4 date east coast tour in October 2010, with supporting acts Right Away, Great Captain, Gobotron and Hardello. Another acoustic 5 date tour by Kevin Devine and Andy Hull alone took place in December 2010, in support of the release, with supporting act Gobotron.

On November 8, 2010, Bad Books released the music video for the official first single "You Wouldn't Have to Ask", on the Spin.com website. The video, which was shot in black and white, was directed by Jason Miller and is based on the Everly Brothers' 1964 performance of the song "Gone, Gone, Gone" on the musical variety series Shindig! On November 30, 2010, the music video was made available for purchase on iTunes.

Track listing

Personnel 
Kevin Devine - lead vocals, guitar, piano
Andy Hull - lead vocals, guitar, piano
Robert McDowell - lead guitar, backing vocals
Chris Freeman - keyboards, backing vocals
Jonathan Corley - bass
Ben Homola - drums, percussion

References 

2010 albums
Razor & Tie albums
Bad Books albums